Pınarbaşı, formerly Tekkeşin, is a town and district of the Kastamonu Province in the Black Sea region of Turkey. It is the seat of Pınarbaşı District. Its population is 2,477 (2021).

Image gallery

References

External links
 Municipality's official website 

Populated places in Kastamonu Province
Pınarbaşı District, Kastamonu